Circulation is a scientific journal published by Lippincott Williams & Wilkins for the American Heart Association. The journal publishes articles related to research in and the practice of cardiovascular diseases, including observational studies, clinical trials, epidemiology, health services and outcomes studies, and advances in applied (translational) and basic research. Its 2020 impact factor is 29.690, ranking it third among journals in the Cardiac and Cardiovascular Systems category and first in the Peripheral Vascular Disease category. Articles become open access after a 12-month embargo period.

2008 saw the appearance of six subspecialty journals.  The first edition of Circulation: Arrhythmia and Electrophysiology appeared in  April 2008, followed by an edition dedicated to heart failure in May titled Circulation: Heart Failure. The remaining four journals launched once per month from July through October 2008.  In order of release they were, Circulation: Cardiovascular Imaging, Circulation: Cardiovascular Interventions, Circulation: Cardiovascular Quality and Outcomes, and Circulation: Cardiovascular Genetics (now published as Circulation: Genomic and Precision Medicine since January 2018).

See also
 Circulation: Cardiovascular Imaging
 Circulation: Cardiovascular Interventions
 Journal of the American College of Cardiology
 European Heart Journal

References

External links 
Circulation home page
Circulation: Arrhythmia and Electrophysiology home page
Circulation: Heart Failure home page
Circulation: Cardiovascular Imaging home page
Circulation: Cardiovascular Interventions home page
Circulation: Cardiovascular Quality and Outcomes home page
Circulation: Genomic and Precision Medicine home page
American Heart Association home page

Cardiology journals
Publications established in 1950
Lippincott Williams & Wilkins academic journals
Weekly journals
1950 establishments in the United States
American Heart Association academic journals